Gulab Singh (1792–1857) was the founder of royal Dogra dynasty and first Maharaja of the princely state of Jammu and Kashmir.

The name may also refer to:
Gulab Singh (Delhi politician)
Gulab Singh (Uttar Pradesh politician)